Allirahu is an islet located in the Baltic Sea, west off the Estonian coast.

See also
 List of islands of Estonia

References

Estonian islands in the Baltic
Saaremaa Parish